Potato yellow dwarf virus (PYDV) is a plant virus of order Mononegavirales, family Rhabdoviridae and genus Alphanucleorhabdovirus. The virus was first identified in 1922 in the US by Barrus and Chupp (1922) who reported a new virus that was killing potatoes. The virus is known for its various effects on potato plants including stunted growth, dwarfing and apical yellowing. The virus also affects the tuber as it causes cracking and malformation. The virus is transmitted by the insect vector Agallia constricta. The insect becomes infected upon feeding on an infected plant and transmits the virus to every plant it feeds upon after this event.

References
Barrus and Chupp (1922). Phytopathology 12: 123.
Plant viruses online

External links
ICTVdB—The Universal Virus Database: Potato yellow dwarf virus 
Family Groups—The Baltimore Method

Potato diseases
Nucleorhabdoviruses
Viral plant pathogens and diseases